Vexillum pulchellum is a species of small sea snail, marine gastropod mollusk in the family Costellariidae, the ribbed miters.

Description
The length of the shell attains 15.6 mm.

Distribution
This species occurs in the Caribbean Sea.

References

 Sarasúa H. (1978). Especies nuevas de Mitridae (Mollusca: Neogastropoda). Poeyana. 180 1-9.
page(s): 4-5, figs 1c-d
 Rosenberg, G.; Moretzsohn, F.; García, E. F. (2009). Gastropoda (Mollusca) of the Gulf of Mexico, Pp. 579–699 in: Felder, D.L. and D.K. Camp (eds.), Gulf of Mexico–Origins, Waters, and Biota. Texas A&M Press, College Station, Texas

External links
 Reeve, L. A. (1844-1845). Monograph of the genus Mitra. In: Conchologia Iconica, or, illustrations of the shells of molluscous animals, vol. 2, pl. 1-39 and unpaginated text. L. Reeve & Co., London.

pulchellum
Gastropods described in 1844